Bermejo Department may refer to:

Bermejo Department, Chaco
Bermejo Department, Formosa

Department name disambiguation pages